Nganbam Sweety Devi (born on 1 January 1998) is an Indian professional footballer from Manipur. She also plays for Odisha FC in Indian Women's League, and India women's national football team.

International career 
Devi scored her national debut goal for the senior team in the match against UAE on 2 October 2021, which they won 4–1 at full-time.

International goals

Honours

India
 SAFF Women's Championship: 2019
 South Asian Games Gold medal: 2019

Sethu
Indian Women's League: 2018–19

KRYPHSA
Indian Women's League runner-up: 2019–20

Manipur
 Senior Women's National Football Championship: 2019–20
 National Games Gold medal: 2022

References

External links 
 Nganbam Sweety Devi at All India Football Federation
 

1998 births
Living people
People from Imphal West district
Footballers from Manipur
Sportswomen from Manipur
Indian women's footballers
Women's association football defenders
Eastern Sporting Union players
Sethu FC players
Kryphsa F.C. Players
Odisha FC Women players
India women's international footballers
India women's youth international footballers
South Asian Games gold medalists for India
South Asian Games medalists in football
Indian Women's League players